Ernesto Benedettini (born 5 March 1948) is a politician of San Marino. He was Captain Regent of San Marino for the term from 1 October 2008 to April 2009 together with Assunta Meloni. In March 2009, Meloni and Benedettini joined in the celebrations of the 50th anniversary of the San Marino National Olympic Committee.

He earlier served as Captain Regent from April to October 1992.

Benedettini is a member of the Sammarinese Christian Democratic Party.

References 

1948 births
Living people
Captains Regent of San Marino
Members of the Grand and General Council
Sammarinese Christian Democratic Party politicians